The Party for Democratic Action or Democratic Action Party (PVD; , PDD) is a political party in Serbia, representing the Albanian ethnic minority. It is currently led by Shaip Kamberi.

Recent history
At the latest legislative election in 2016, the party received one seat in parliament, a drop from its peak of two seats in 2014 election. It raised to 3 seats in 2020, following a campaign by Albania's foreign service to increase the political participation of Albanian ethnic minority from the Presevo Valley in Serbia's political elections.

Electoral performance

Parliamentary elections

References

External links
Party for Democratic Action Official website

1990 establishments in Serbia
Albanians in Serbia
Political parties established in 1990
Political parties of minorities in Serbia
Pro-European political parties in Serbia
Regionalist parties
Centre-right parties in Europe